Viktorija Rajicic (Viktorija Rajičić, ; born 7 April 1994) is an Australian former tennis player. She turned professional after playing in the first round of the WTA Tour doubles event at the Sydney International on 9 January 2011. In October 2013, she achieved a career-high ranking of world No. 279.

Career summary
Rajicic who resides in Melbourne was coached by Geoff Guy and Chris Mahony.

She received a wild card into the girls' singles main draw of the 2009 Australian Open. Later in April, she made it to the final of the Optus 16s Autumn Nationals held at the Glen Iris Valley Recreation Club in Glen Iris, Victoria. In October, she represented Australia in the Junior Fed Cup held at San Luis Potosí, Mexico.

In 2011, Rajicic fell in the first singles qualifying rounds of Sydney and the Australian Open. She played doubles at the Sydney International and the Australian Open but both times lost in the first round of the main draw.

Rajicic started the new season by playing in the qualifying draw of the 2012 Apia International Sydney. She defeated Anna Tatishvili in the first round, but was beaten by Polona Hercog in the second.

In March 2013, Rajicic won her first title, defeating Yurika Sema in Bundaberg in straight sets.
In October, she jumped 18 spots to a career-high mark of 290 after reaching the quarterfinals of a $25,000 event in Perth.

Four years later, in October 2017, she played her last match on the professional circuit.

ITF finals

Singles (2–1)

Doubles (2–3)

Grand Slam doubles performance timeline

References

Further reading

External links
 
 
  (archive)

1994 births
Living people
Australian people of Serbian descent
Australian female tennis players
Tennis players from Melbourne
Sportswomen from Victoria (Australia)